Stefano De Luca (born 7 April 1942 in Paceco, Sicily) is an Italian politician and lawyer.

Biography
De Luca was member of the Chamber of Deputies from 1983 to 1994 for the Italian Liberal Party. He also served as Undersecretary at the Ministry of Finance from 1987 to 1994 in the governments led by Goria, De Mita, Andreotti, Amato and Ciampi.

In 1994 he was elected MEP among the ranks of Forza Italia as member of the Union of the Centre and joined the Group of the European Liberal Democrat and Reform Party.

In 1997 he re-founded the Liberal Party, of which he was the secretary until 2014 (when he was appointed president of the party).

In the 2018 general election he was a candidate for the Senate with the League in Campania, but he was not elected.

References

1942 births
Living people
Italian Liberal Party politicians
Italian Liberal Party (1997) politicians
Deputies of Legislature IX of Italy
Deputies of Legislature X of Italy
Deputies of Legislature XI of Italy
MEPs for Italy 1994–1999
Politicians of Sicily